Mickey's 60th Birthday is a 1988 American live-action/animated television special broadcast on The Magical World of Disney on November 13, 1988 on NBC. As the title suggests, it was produced for the 60th anniversary of the Mickey Mouse character. Like Who Framed Roger Rabbit (which had been recently released at the time), much of the footage featured in the film is live-action with newly made animation (although some of the animation used for some scenes was made from existing footage) provided by Murakami-Wolf-Swenson. It was rebroadcast on Disney Channel Europe on November 18, 2008 to celebrate the 20th anniversary of the special, as well as Mickey's 80th birthday.

As an NBC spectacular, the special features the cast of several contemporary NBC television shows, including Family Ties, Cheers, Hunter, L.A. Law and The Cosby Show.

Plot
Mickey Mouse's 60th Birthday special is being taped and as his appearance in the show draws to a close, Mickey (voiced by Wayne Allwine) finds himself trying to decide how he should present himself to his audience. Rummaging through an old trunk, he finds the magic hat from The Sorcerer's Apprentice segment of Fantasia and considers using it, but he is warned by an evil sorcerer (voiced by Peter Cullen) who owns the hat (who was not Yen Sid) that he shouldn't be using other people's magic when he has his own, which Mickey initially doesn't understand. With that in mind, Mickey goes out on stage along with his birthday cake, provided by Roger Rabbit (voiced by Charles Fleischer), who realizes that he placed a stick of dynamite on the cake instead of a candle. In his attempt to put the dynamite out, Roger ends up destroying the set, which prompts Mickey to use the magic from the hat to repair the damage. The audience screams for more and Mickey agrees to do so, but when he does, he suddenly vanishes.

The sorcerer, annoyed that Mickey disobeyed his warning, decides to teach the Mouse how to find his own kind of magic, by casting a spell on him in which anyone he runs into fails to recognize him as Mickey Mouse. The Mouse is then returned to the real world, where he's found by Andy Keaton of Family Ties, who mistakenly believes him to be a good impression of the real thing. Andy shows Mickey off to Mallory and Jennifer, but when they're not convinced, and even Andy turns him down, to Mickey's dismay. He later goes to the bar from Cheers, only to realize he has no money to buy himself a drink. He then sings the "Happy Birthday" song to Rebecca Howe, cheering her up so much that she takes him out to dinner and a movie.

Meanwhile, The Walt Disney Company has organized a search party, led by Sergeant Rick Hunter (from Hunter) to find the missing Mickey, which was reported on a local news show. In the process, anchorpersons Dudley Goode (John Ritter) and Mia Loud (Jill Eikenberry) begin to suspect Donald Duck (voiced by Tony Anselmo) after being told of how upset he was that he wasn't going to appear in Mickey's special. Their suspicions go even further when they find old footage in Donald's trash of Donald doing his own version of The Mickey Mouse Club theme song, and Donald is soon arrested after he tries (unsuccessfully) to testify his innocence (he claimed that the kidnapper was either Minnie Mouse (voiced by Russi Taylor), "the guy who framed Roger Rabbit", the Wicked Witch or Porky Pig). Donald is to be represented by the legal firm of McKenzie, Brackman, Chaney and Kuzak. As they continue with their reports on the search, the reporters show various clip montages of Mickey and various tributes.

As the special nears its end, Mickey returns to Disneyland, where a custodian (Cheech Marin) mopes over the fact that he can't see any point in his profession if the guest of honor isn't going to show up for his own birthday party. A fellow custodian (Phylicia Rashad) then sings a song called "It's Magic" to cheer him up, with Mickey accompanying the ensuing song-and-dance number. At this point, the sorcerer reappears and congratulates Mickey now that he's finally found his own magic inside him and thus breaks the spell. Just as the sorcerer exits, Roger rushes up to Mickey and instantly recognizes him. The news of Roger having "found" Mickey is brought to the news and the innocent Donald is released from jail just in time to join Mickey's birthday celebration. Soon, a parade appears, taking Mickey to Sleeping Beauty Castle, where Minnie is. People in the parade throw him up to the balcony of Sleeping Beauty Castle where Minnie is standing. Finally, Mickey and Minnie are reunited.

Also making cameo appearances are several reporters for NBC stations, including Allison Rosati of WGRZ-TV and Sue Simmons of WNBC-TV.

Cast
 Carl Reiner as Mel Fellini
 Charles Fleischer as Charlie the Stage Manager and the voice of Roger Rabbit
 John Ritter as Dudley Goode
 Jill Eikenberry as Mia Loud
 Michael Eisner as Himself
 Brian Bonsall as Andy Keaton
 Justine Bateman as Mallory Keaton
 Michael J. Fox as Alex P. Keaton (flashback clip)
 Tina Yothers as Jennifer Keaton
 Ed McMahon as Himself
 Fred Dryer as Sergeant Rick Hunter
 Michael Tucker as Stuart Markowitz
 Jimmy Smits as Victor Sifuentes
 Alan Rachins as Douglas Brackman, Jr.
 Richard A. Dysart as Leland Mackenzie
 Corbin Bernsen as Arnie Becker
 Blair Underwood as Jonathan Rollins
 Harry Hamlin as Michael Kuzak
 George Wendt as Norm Peterson
 Woody Harrelson as Woody Boyd
 Ted Danson as Sam Malone
 Kelsey Grammer as Frasier Crane
 Rhea Perlman as Carla Tortelli
 John Ratzenberger as Cliff Clavin
 Kirstie Alley as Rebecca Howe
 Cheech Marin as the Disneyland custodian
 Phylicia Rashad as the Disneyland dancer
 Bea Arthur as Dorothy Zbornak
 Estelle Getty as Sophia Petrillo
 Rue McClanahan as Blanche Devereaux
 Betty White as Rose Nylund
 Burt Reynolds as Himself
 Dyan Cannon as Herself
 Phil Collins as Himself
 Annette Funicello as Herself
 Bette Midler as Herself
 Barbara Hershey as Herself

Voice cast
 Wayne Allwine as Mickey Mouse
 Tony Anselmo as Donald Duck
 Peter Cullen as the Wizard
 Russi Taylor as Minnie Mouse

See also 
Mickey's 50, a 1978 special honoring Mickey Mouse's 50th birthday.
Mickey's 90th Spectacular, a 2018 special honoring Mickey Mouse's 90th birthday.

References

External links
 

1980s American television specials
1980s animated television specials
Animated crossover television specials
1988 television specials
1988 in American television
Disney television specials
Walt Disney anthology television series episodes
NBC television specials
American children's comedy films
American films with live action and animation